Minerva protecting Peace from Mars or Peace and War is a painting by Peter Paul Rubens. He produced it in London between 1629 and 1630, during a diplomatic mission from the Spanish Netherlands to Charles I of England. It is now in the National Gallery, London.

It shows Minerva (goddess of war, wisdom and crafts) fighting off Mars, with a nude figure of Peace in the centre.

References

External links
 Catalogue entry

1630 paintings
Paintings by Peter Paul Rubens in the National Gallery, London
Paintings of Mars (mythology)
Paintings of Minerva
Cats in art
Paintings of children
Musical instruments in art
Women in art
Nude art
Mythological paintings by Peter Paul Rubens